The Klostertaler Gscheid is a  high mountain pass in southern Lower Austria, which links the Klostertal valley (municipality of Gutenstein) with the valley of the River Voisbach (municipality of  Schwarzau im Gebirge). At the summit of the pass is a small chapel. A tarmac state road (Landesstraße) runs over the pass. The road runs from northeast to southwest along the northern slopes of the Schneeberg. Because of the sparse population of the region the pass only is only of local significance. It is not closed in winter.

See also
 List of highest paved roads in Europe
 List of mountain passes

Mountain passes of Lower Austria
Mountain passes of the Alps